Vezey is a name. Notable people with this name include:

Surname
 Ed Vezey, survivor of USS Oklahoma (BB-37)
 Pamela Vezey (1932–1992), English actress

Given name
 Vezey Raffety (1906–1991), English cricket player
 Vezey Strong (1857–1920), English businessman